Krishna Chandra Singh Pradhan (1925–2010) was a famous litterateur and critic of Nepal. He received the prestigious Madan Puraskar for Kavi Vyathit ra Kavya Sadhana, a literary criticism on Kedar Man Vyathit in 1958.

Early life 
He was born on 26 July 1925 (11 Shrawan 1982 BS) to father Surya Prasad Singh Pradhan and mother Maya Devi in Nhuchhen Galli Kathmandu.

Notable works 
Essay collections

 Salik
 Anaam Satya
 Bagmati ko Haraf
 Samya Tsunami

Poetry collection

 Bhanjyang Neri

Literary criticism

 Kavi Vyathit ra Kavya Sadhana
 Nepali Upanyas ra Upanyaskar
 Srijanako Serophero
 Kriti ko Awalokan

Memoir

 Napharkine Ti Dinharu
 Jindagi ka Tippaniharu

Awards 
Pradhan's literary career has been recognized with prestigious awards like Madan Puraskar, Sajha Puraskar, which he won two times, and Uttam Puraskar.

Personal life 
He died on 29 June 2010 (17 Ashar 2067) in Kathmandu. He was survived by his son and two daughters.

References

News

Nepali-language writers
2010 deaths
People from Kathmandu
20th-century Nepalese male writers
Sajha Puraskar winners
Madan Puraskar winners
Nepalese literary critics

1925 births
20th-century Nepalese poets